Coptic pronunciation reform, since 1850, has resulted in two major shifts in the liturgical pronunciation of Bohairic, the dialect of Coptic used as the language of the Coptic Orthodox Church. Since Coptic had ceased to be spoken as a mother-tongue by this time, a change in education changed how the language was spoken. The two traditions of pronunciation in contemporary use arise from two successive reforms in the 19th and 20th centuries:
 The "reformed pronunciation" or "Greco-Bohairic pronunciation", mandated by Cyril IV (1854–1861), models the pronunciation of the sounds of Coptic, after how the sounds written with the equivalent letters were pronounced in Modern Greek.
 The "Old Bohairic pronunciation" aims to reconstruct the pronunciation of the language as it was before this reform.

Reformed pronunciation (Greco-Bohairic)

During the time of Pope Cyril IV of Alexandria (1854–1861), there were discussions between the Coptic and Greek Orthodox Churches of Alexandria about whether to unite, so one Patriarch would be the head of both Churches in Egypt. The unification did not come about, but one of the proposals made at the time was to make Coptic pronunciation conform more closely to Greek.

The chief architect of this project was Arian G. Moftah, who taught Coptic in the Patriarchal Church at that time. Since the Coptic alphabet shares many letters with the Greek alphabet, he assumed that any change of Coptic pronunciation towards Greek would be a positive reform and would also assist with the expected union between the churches. The caveats are: 
a) There is no evidence that Coptic adopted the exact phonetic values of Greek alphabet.
b) There is uncertainty which dialect of Greek was spoken predominantly in Egypt, or whether Copts spoke an Egyptian dialect of Greek.
c) Greek has undergone several natural phonetic changes, to the extent that the Koine Greek phonetic values are not certain at this time.
d) The assumption that reverting to the source language is a process of reform is based on the assumption that any source language should be the reference point for hybrid, or creole languages or pidgins. In modern linguistics, once a nation adopts a language or adopts elements of another language into their own, it becomes a separate entity, akin to Canadian French or American English, or Brazilian Portuguese, or other languages with influence from other languages as the influence of Arabic on Persian, Maltese, Turkish & Swahili.
At the time, popular feeling in Egypt had been stirred up by the French military campaigns (1798–1801), whose scientists remained in Egypt for some years, and many people had come to feel that the European ideas and practices were superior to Egyptian (or Ottoman) customs.

The reformed pronunciation (Greco-Bohairic pronunciation) was spread by the authority of the Klirikia (Theological Seminary) but not without controversy, and by the 1950s it had become established throughout Egypt except in a small number of parishes in upper Egypt that refuse to accept any priest from outside the local village. In the course of this campaign of reform, the old Bohairic pronunciation was often inaccurately referred to as Sahidic, the name of another Coptic dialect. However, some European Coptologists commented on the fact that the villagers of Upper Egypt retained a more authentic tradition, and wrote disparagingly about the Greek-influenced pronunciation. Most notably Dr G. Sobhy commented on Greco-Bohairic pronunciation in an article saying, "All modern books written on Coptic by native authors adopt more or less a mutilated form of Greek pronunciation and apply it entirely to their language. Unfortunately none of our native authors here knows sufficient Greek to realise the outstanding mistakes he is trying to form into rules applicable to the Coptic language."

Old Bohairic pronunciation

During the 1960s, with the encouragement of Pope Shenouda III of Alexandria, Dr Emile Maher studied the history of Coptic pronunciation and in 1968, he announced that he had rediscovered the Old Bohairic pronunciation. After completing a doctorate on the subject at Oxford University (Thesis available online), he returned to Egypt hoping to restore the older way of pronouncing Coptic in place of the reformed pronunciation (sometimes referred to as Greco-Bohairic). The Institute of Coptic Language, which studied and promoted the Old Bohairic pronunciation, came under strong opposition from some Church leaders, but the Pope continued to support Dr Maher, and ordained him priest (as Father Shenouda) in the 1990s. The Old Bohairic pronunciation is used in the Monastery of St. Shenouda in Rochester, New York, in which Father Shenouda Maher now serves.

The Old Bohairic pronunciation is evidence-based, using archived sound recordings and transcriptions of the oral tradition of Zeneya, Dabeyya, and other villages made by various scholars such as Georgy Sobhy, Petraeus, Galtier, Maria Cramer, Rochmonteix, in addition to the works of W.H. Worrell and Vycichl. Maher also consulted documents held in libraries and monasteries throughout Egypt, including Coptic manuscripts written in the Arabic script, such as the Damanhour euchologion, and tenth-century Arabic texts written in Coptic letters, and he analysed scribal transcription errors in the manuscripts tradition.

References
 Crum, Walter Ewing. A Coptic dictionary. Oxford : Clarendon Press, 1939.
 Ishak, Emile Maher. The Phonetics and Phonology of the Bohairic Dialect of Coptic and the Survival of Coptic Words in the Colloquial and Classical Arabic of Egypt and of Coptic Grammatical Constructions in Colloquial Arabic. Volumes I - IV. (D.Phil. Thesis submitted to the University of Oxford, September 1975). AVAILABLE ONLINE
 Maher, Emil, PhD Copts and their language
 Maher, Emil, PhD Cagi
 Bulletin de la Société d'Archéologie Copte (BSAC), Le Caïre.
 Satzinger, Helmut. The pronunciation of late Bohairic. In: Aziz S. Atiya (ed.), The Coptic Encyclopedia. Vol. 8, 60–65.
 Sobhy, Georgy PG (1915). The pronunciation of Coptic in the Church of Egypt. Journal of Egyptian Archaeology 2(1):15–19.) 
 Worrell, William Hoyt. Coptic sounds. University of Michigan Studies Humanistic Series; XXVI. Ann Arbor : University of Michigan press, 1934.
 Worrell, William Hoyt. Coptic Texts in the University of Michigan Collection (With a study in the popular traditions of Coptic). University of Michigan Studies Humanistic Series; 46. Ann Arbor : London, 1942.

External links
Copticsounds – a resource for the study of Coptic phonology
Fr. Shenouda Maher Isaac: the Original Bohairic pronunciation
Information about both the new and old coptic
Debate concerning the use of Old Bohairic vs Greco Bohairic
forum aims to revive the old pronunciation

Coptic language
Coptic Orthodox Church
Linguistic purism